Kachru or Kachroo (Kashmiri:) is a Kashmiri Pandit surname and clan. Kachrus originate from the Kashmir Valley of Jammu and Kashmir, India. Plenty of Kachrus retained their Hindu last name after they converted to Islam.

Notable people with the surname include:

 Braj Kachru (1923–2016), Indian linguist
 Shamit Kachru (born 1970), theoretical physicist, son of Braj and Yamuna
 Yamuna Kachru (1933–2013), linguist, wife of Braj

References

Indian surnames
Hindu surnames
Kashmiri-language surnames
Kashmiri tribes